was a Japanese warrior, nobleman (samurai). He can also can be referred to as Kikuchi no Jiro Takanao or Kikuchi Higo-Gon-no-Kami Takanao.

When Kikuchi Takanao sided with Minamoto no Yoritomo and began levying troops in Kyūshū in 1180, at the beginning of the Genpei War, Sadayoshi marched against him and defeated Takanao. Kikuchi Takanao was present at the Battle of Dan-no-ura. Shortly after the battle in the same year, he was turned over to Minamoto Yoshitsune by his lord Ogata no Saburo Koreyoshi. He was taken to the Rokujo riverbed and his head was cut off.

"One of your retainers, Kikuchi no Jiro Takanao, has been my enemy for years ... You may rely on me if you will turn Kikuchi over for execution."[3] -Minamoto no Yoshitsune

At the end of the twelfth century events far away in eastern Japan led to the establishment of Japan's first military government, the Kamakura Bakufu, which, during the initial stages at least, ran in tandem with the old imperial administration. The wars surrounding the birth of this new regime saw the Kikuchi clan coalesce into a powerful warrior league, or bushidan. In 1181/2, their leader Kikuchi Takanao, joined with Ogata no Saburo Koreyoshi of Bungo, another important local warrior, in rebellion against the Taira, which converted them into de facto allies of Minamoto Yoritomo, founder of the Bakufu. 

This rising was, however, crushed by Haruda Tanenao. Then, perversely, as the fighting drew to a close and the Taira star waned, the Kikuchi chose to align themselves with the erstwhile enemies and, together with the leading Kyūshū warriors including the Haruda, Yamaga, and Itai, suffered a crushing defeat at the hands of the now triumphant Bakufu. The battle took place off the coast of Kyūshū, at Dannoura, and it saw the emergence of Minamoto Yoritomo as Japan's unquestioned military leader. His forces were drawn largely from the east, while, in the dying moments, the Taira had relied almost exclusively on warriors from Kyūshū. The new military regime, therefore, titled decidedly toward the east and against the west, a fact that was to have profound consequences for the island's future.

1185 deaths
People of Kamakura-period Japan
Samurai
Year of birth unknown